The University Student Council of the University of the Philippines Diliman (Filipino: Ang Konseho ng Mag-aaral ng Unibersidad ng Pilipinas Diliman) is the official student representative body of the Philippines' premiere institution of higher learning. As such, it represents the interests of the students within and outside the University. The University Student Council, also known as USC, exists to represent UP students in various affairs of the University, acting as the voice of students in the local, national, and international issues.

As the highest student representative body in the university, the USC is composed of members elected amongst the student body, mandated to organize and direct campaigns and activities to defend and promote students’ rights, and improve the students’ general welfare. Furthermore, it provides direct services to the student body.

Structure

Membership

Reflecting the collegiate nature of the University of the Philippines itself, USC is both an association of UP's more than 28,000 individual students and a federation of the different college student councils in UP that represent all undergraduate and graduate students.

Governance

The USC is composed of the following officers: Chairperson (who serves as chief executive officer), Vice Chairperson (who serves as convenor of the League of College Councils or LCC), and twelve (12) University Councilors, all elected at large. In addition, each degree granting college is represented in the USC by a College Representative(s).

The chairperson supervises the standing and special standing committees of the USC, which is organized at the beginning of each term.

The standing committees of the USC are:
Secretariat Committee headed by the Secretary General 
Finance Committee headed by the Treasurer
Ways and Means Committee headed by the Business Manager
Mass Media Committee headed by the Public Relations Officer

Finances
The USC is financed by the compulsory Student Fund generated from the fees collected from students upon registration, sponsorships from the activities and donations. It also receives grants for specific projects and activities.

History

1913-1950

The Student Council of UP was instituted in 1913 under the auspices of UP President Barlett. Manuel Tabora of the UP College of Law was the first Chairman of the Student Council. On October 6, 1913, the USC participated in the popular demonstration in honor of Governor-General Harrison.

On December 15, 1917, the first student protest took place against a Manila police captain and his men for arresting Victoriano Yamzon during the first University Day. The police mistook the first editor of College Folio as part of an unruly crowd.

On March 12, 1918, there was a protest by Freshmen, who petitioned to Board of Regents to extend their scholarship. On July 17, 1918, students led by Carlos P. Romulo and Jose Romero held a rally from UP to Sta Cruz Bridge at The Manila Times office to protest the editorial of the newspaper criticizing UP President Ignacio Villamor.

On January 21, 1921, the Executive Committee (EC) of the University approved a memorandum embodying the idea of creating an inter-collegiate student council. In 1922 the EC approved the adoption by the student body of a so-called "bill of rights of the USC". It would take two more years before the constitutional convention for the creation of a USC would take place. The Bill of Rights resolved:

 To develop university spirit among the ranks of students and promote their general welfare.
 To advise the President of UP on student matters, affairs, activities of distinctly inter-collegiate concern.
 To organize and direct student activities of inter-collegiate nature.
 To adopt its own Constitution and promulgate rules and by-laws for its own internal and general government.
 To have such powers and perform such other duties as the university authorities may from time to time grant or delegate to the USC.

On September 27, 1924, UP President Rafael Palma revived the University Student Council (USC). The student fund was Php 1.50. The first projects of the USC were the establishment of the post office building and awarding of scholarships and medals to outstanding students. On January 31, 1926, USC initiated the first meeting of students from different colleges and schools ever held in Manila at the Zorilla theater. The USC then was composed of 96 members, with each class of every college entitled to two representatives. The USC also published The Philippinensian. In 1927 the USC passed a resolution radically reducing the number of USC members to 24. In 1929 the USC protested the increase of fees and the rigid rules of the Department of Physical Education.

On January 18, 1933, there was a student demonstration in support of the Hare-Hawes Cutting Act. President Quezon disapproved of the rally, saying that students should be studying for their examinations and should not participate in political affairs. Students also held another rally the same year protesting a bill that would reorganize government personnel except legislators. Lawmakers who visited the university were booed and heckled.

In June 1935, both USC candidates for the position of President received an equal number of votes, even after two hours of repeated deliberations. The candidates agreed to divide the term upon the behest of the council adviser, breaking the deadlock.

In 1937, UP students and faculty campaigned for the right of Filipino women to vote. On February 5, 1939, the USC petitioned the BOR that it be given the power to elect the Editor-in-Chief of the Philippine Collegian. The USC reasoned that since it was the highest governing student body, it must be given control over the official student organ.

In 1940, the USC office was moved to the second floor of the newly built Alumni Hall with the Philippine Collegian, The Philippinensian and the Institute of National Language. The USC also started to elect a Vice-Chairperson not from UP Los Banos Representatives. Instead they elected a student from Veterinary Science to be the Vice-Chair.

1946 USC was revived after World War II together with other student organizations, notably the Junior and Senior Student Councils. USC passed a resolution affirming faith in UP President Gonzales amidst rumors the university was not satisfied with his administration. In April 1948 USC President Villanueva observed that a major problem in the university was the deficiency of the students in their command of English.

In 1950 Huks attacked the PC Detachment in Balara, sending dorm residents to take cover in basements and in the Law building.

1951-1968

During this period the UP Student Council counted several people as members who would later become prominent public figures, including Marcelo Fernan, Homobono Adaza, Randy David, Delfin Lazaro, Miriam Defensor.

On March 29, 1951, the USC, Senior Student Council, Junior Student Council and the Woman's Club led the first UP Diliman student rally to Malacañan Palace to express support for UP President Gonzales, who invited Claro M. Recto, arch-critic of President Quirino, to deliver the commencement address at the UP graduation. Vidal Tan eventually replaced Gonzales, but the students won the right to hear Recto at their graduation and have Gonzales sign their diplomas instead of President Tan. On November 30, 1952, USC Chair Rafael Salas led the students to a rally at Malacañan Palace protesting the policies of President Elpidio Quirino.

On August 4, 1955, USC Chair Fernando Campos held an emergency meeting expressing support for three members of the Board of Regents (BOR) and planned a rally demanding the ouster of Fr. John Patrick Delaney from UP for interfering in university affairs. In November 1955 the UP Student Catholic Action (UPSCA) and the Upsilon Sigma Phi fraternity war flared anew when four UPSCA USC members filed charges against Campos, an Upsilonian. The charges were illegal alteration of USC Resolution of August 4, grave abuse of power, and shameful conduct unbecoming his office. Campos countercharged that the complainants were conducting a systematic campaign of vilification against him. Both charges were dropped by the University Committee on Student Organizations and Associations. On June 22, 1956, UPSCA took full control of USC, defeating Upsilon from top post to minor posts.

On December 16–17, 1957, a "peaceful and spontaneous" student strike led by USC took place in response to inaction from the BOR to elect a new UP President. The University Council (UC) was forced to declare an early Christmas vacation. On the third day of strike, students held a victory motorcade around Quezon City and Manila passing Malacañan Palace. On January 2, 1958, the Executive Committee (EC) of UP entered dialogue with student leaders to discontinue future strikes. On January 20, 1958, students Johnny Antillon, Emmanuel Santos, Epifanio San Juan, Jr., and Romulo Villa petitioned to expel USC Chair and Vice Chair Lagua and Adaza, first for the illegal and immoral use of the Philippine Collegian to malign the BOR and the UP administration, and second for inciting 1,000 university students to join the student strike. On March 30, 1958, the EC sustained recommendations that Lagua be suspended for nine months and removed as USC Chair. Adaza permanently dropped out from the rolls of the university. The two were required to apologize in writing to the BOR. Senator Emmanuel Pelaez spoke on behalf of the two and declared that they had suffered from a serious miscarriage of justice.

On June 24, 1958, UP President Vicente Sinco issued Administrative Circular no. 1, which limited the representation of any student organization to one representative only in each of the student councils, to counter the dominance of the UPSCA. UPSCA said the circular was "illegal, discriminatory, unreasonable, undemocratic and arbitrary", and filed a case in court. The Supreme Court dismissed the petition on technical grounds, saying that UPSCA should have exhausted administrative remedies within the university. The decision came only in 1960. In effect, there was no USC from 1958-1960. In January 1961, the BOR approved Article 448, the Circular no. 1 of Pres. Sinco. It also approved Article 437, which provided for a Student Union which would take charge of cultural and social programs and activities of the student body.

On March 14, 1961, there was an investigation by the Committee Against Anti-Filipino Activities (CAFA) on 10 UP professors for their alleged involvement in communist activities. 1,000 UP students held a demonstration in Congress to denounce the investigation.

On January 6, 1962, the Student Union protested President Macapagal's offer to Carlos P. Romulo to become UP President, saying that "UP is not an auction bloc at Macapagal's personal disposal". On January 12, 1962, Union Chair Enrique Voltaire Garcia led the UP students to a rally in front of Quezon Hall affirming support and trust in BOR, the sole body tasked to choose the UP President. On January 18, 1962, the Student Union met for two hours to pass a resolution calling Macapagal to withdraw the offer to Romulo "in order that the independence and prestige of the state university may be restored". 38 Union members voted "yes" to the resolution, with three voting against. Romulo became President anyway in June of that year, and restored the USC, which presented former UP President Sinco with a plaque during his resignation for his "commitment to the preservation of the free and secular nature of the university".

In July 1963, President Romulo proclaimed the Academic Year 1963–1964 as the Year of the Student. In 1964-65, the USC initiated the jeepney campus boycott, until fares for campus rides were reduced to five centavos from 10 centavos. In December 1964, the Student Cultural Association in UP (SCAUP) made a float for the Lantern Parade with Jun Tera in the stance and uniform of a Vietnamese guerilla. Instead of Christmas Carols, the students sang The Internationale.

On September 11, 1966, USC Chair Voltaire Garcia led a large demonstration at the Palace to protest against the deployment of Filipino forces for a foreign war. On October 24, 1966, the USC led a march of students from Quezon City to the Manila Hotel, where the Manila Summit was held. 5,000 students protested the continuing American intervention in the Vietnam War. Police violently dispersed the protesters, with many injured. The USC called for an inter-university rally of indignation, and the October 24 Movement was formed. The USC called for a National Students' Congress for the advancement of nationalism to be held in Diliman, which was attended by 500 student leaders. In July 1968, the USC, Philippine Collegian, Katipunang Makabansa, Pagkakaisa, and the Partisans led 14 busloads of students to the Congress building to oppose the Second Philippine Civil Action Group bill on the involvement of the country in the Vietnam War. On August 16, 1968, Metrocom dispersed a rally led by UP students at the US Embassy and Malacañang to protest the "Special Relations" between the Philippines and USA. Five UP students suffered bruises. In September 1968, Senator Lorenzo Tañada, head of the Movement for the Advancement of Nationalism (MAN) protested the Americanization of UP. USC started leading demonstrations against the Vietnam War, Philippine participation in the war, oil monopolies, implementation of the retail trade nationalization laws, and US imperialism.

University Student Council (USC) Chairpersons

See also
 University of the Philippines
 University of the Philippines Diliman

References

External links
 Official website
 UPD Student Information and Services
 University of the Philippines
 University of the Philippines Diliman

University of the Philippines Diliman
Student organizations in the Philippines
Students' unions in the Philippines